Wartburg Press was the publishing house of the first American Lutheran Church (ALC), formed in 1930. It was headquartered in Columbus, Ohio. At the time of the merger of first ALC with other church bodies to form the second American Lutheran Church in 1960, Wartburg Press merged with the publishing houses of those other bodies to form Augsburg Publishing House.

References 

Christian publishing companies
Book publishing companies based in Minnesota
Publishing companies established in 1988
Evangelical Lutheran Church in America